Khabib Abdulmanapovich Nurmagomedov (born 20 September 1988) is a Russian former professional mixed martial artist. He competed in the lightweight division of the Ultimate Fighting Championship (UFC), where he was the longest-reigning UFC Lightweight Champion ever, having held the title from April 2018 to March 2021. With 29 wins and no losses, he retired with an undefeated record. Nurmagomedov is widely considered to be among the greatest mixed martial artists of all time, and was inducted into the UFC Hall of Fame on June 30, 2022.

A two-time Combat Sambo World Champion, Nurmagomedov has a background in the disciplines of sambo, judo and wrestling. Nurmagomedov was ranked #1 in the UFC men's pound-for-pound rankings at the time of his retirement, until being removed following his title vacation in March 2021. Fight Matrix ranks him as the #1 lightweight of all time.

Coming from the Republic of Dagestan in Russia, Nurmagomedov is the first Muslim to win a UFC title. He is the most-followed Russian on Instagram, with more than  followers as of December 2022. He is also a mixed martial arts (MMA) promoter, known for promoting the Eagle Fighting Championship (EFC). Since retirement, he has transitioned to a mixed martial arts coach and cornerman.

Early life 
Khabib Abdulmanapovich Nurmagomedov was born to an Avar family on 20 September 1988, in the village of Sildi in the Tsumadinsky District of the Dagestan ASSR, an autonomous republic within the Russian SFSR, Soviet Union. He has an older brother, Magomed, and younger sister, Amina. His father's family had moved from Sildi to Kirovaul, where his father converted the ground floor of their two-storey building into a gym. Nurmagomedov grew up in the household with his siblings and cousins. His interest in martial arts began when watching students training at the gym. Khabib's training as a child included wrestling a bear when he was nine years old.

As is common with many children in Dagestan, he began wrestling from an early age: he started at the age of eight under the tutelage of his father, Abdulmanap Nurmagomedov. A decorated athlete and a veteran of the Soviet Army, Abdulmanap had also wrestled from an early age, before undergoing training in judo and sambo in the military. Abdulmanap dedicated his life to coaching the youth in Dagestan, in hopes of offering an alternative to the Islamic extremism common to the region.

In 2001, his family moved to Makhachkala, the capital of Dagestan, where he trained in wrestling from the age of 12, and judo from 15. He resumed training in combat sambo, under his father, at 17. According to Nurmagomedov, the transition from wrestling to judo was difficult, but his father wanted him to get used to competing in a gi jacket. Abdulmanap was a senior coach for the combat sambo national team in the Republic of Dagestan, training several athletes in sambo in Makhachkala, Russia. Nurmagomedov frequently got into street fights in his youth, before focusing his attention on mixed martial arts. Khabib said that, along with his father, three athletes who inspired him were the American boxers Muhammad Ali and Mike Tyson and the Brazilian footballer Ronaldo.

Mixed martial arts career

Early career 
Nurmagomedov made his professional MMA debut in September 2008 and compiled four wins in under a month. On 11 October, he became the inaugural Atrium Cup tournament champion, having defeated his three opponents at the Moscow event. Over the next three years, he went undefeated, finishing 11 out of 12 opponents. These included a first-round armbar finish of future Bellator title challenger Shahbulat Shamhalaev, which marked his M-1 Global debut. In 2011, he competed in seven fights for the ProFC promotion, all of which he won by TKO or submission.

A 16–0 record in the regional circuits of Russia and Ukraine generated interest from the Ultimate Fighting Championship (UFC) in signing Nurmagomedov. Later, Nurmagomedov's father revealed in an interview that due to a contract dispute with ProFC they had 11 court cases contesting the legitimacy of Nurmagomedov's UFC contract. After losing six and winning five cases, they reached an agreement and Khabib was able to continue his career.

Ultimate Fighting Championship

Early UFC fights and championship pursuits 
In late 2011, Nurmagomedov signed a six-fight deal to compete in the UFC's lightweight division.

In his UFC debut, on 20 January 2012 at UFC on FX 1, Nurmagomedov defeated Kamal Shalorus via submission in the third round.

Nurmagomedov next defeated Gleison Tibau on 7 July 2012 at UFC 148 via unanimous decision, with all three judges scoring the fight 30–27.

Nurmagomedov's next fight was against Thiago Tavares on 19 January 2013 at UFC on FX 7. He won via KO in the first round. After the fight, Tavares tested positive for Drostanolone, an anabolic steroid, and received a 9-month suspension.

Nurmagomedov defeated Abel Trujillo on 25 May 2013 at UFC 160 via unanimous decision, with all three judges scoring the fight 30–27. At the weigh-ins, Nurmagomedov came in over the permitted limit, weighing in at 158.5 lb. He was given two hours to cut to the lightweight maximum of 156 pounds but elected instead to surrender a percentage of his fight purse to Trujillo and the bout was contested at a catchweight. In the course of the fight, Nurmagomedov set a new UFC record for the most takedowns in a single fight, with 21 successful takedowns out of 28 attempts.

In his fifth UFC fight, on 21 September 2013 at UFC 165, Nurmagomedov faced Pat Healy. He dominated the fight and won via unanimous decision, with all three judges scoring the fight 30–27. Attending his first post-event press conference, UFC president Dana White praised the relative newcomer stating, "That slam, when he just scoops him up and slams him, Matt Hughes style. That reminded me of the old Matt Hughes where he would run a guy across the Octagon and slam him. The kid is exciting. We’re probably going to do big things with this kid."

In December, Nurmagomedov challenged Gilbert Melendez on social media, with the two then expected to face off at UFC 170 on 22 February 2014. However, the bout was cancelled for undisclosed reasons, and Melendez was replaced by Nate Diaz. However, the match-up was cancelled as Diaz turned the bout down. Nurmagomedov expressed his disappointment, appearing on The MMA Hour, "If they say that they're willing to fight the best, they should fight the best. If they want, I'll take them both at once in the cage."

Nurmagomedov next faced former UFC Lightweight Champion Rafael dos Anjos on 19 April 2014 at UFC on Fox 11. He dominated the fight and won via unanimous decision, with all three judges scoring the fight 30–27.

Nurmagomedov was briefly linked to a bout with Donald Cerrone on 27 September 2014 at UFC 178. However, the pairing was quickly scrapped after it was revealed that Nurmagomedov had suffered a knee injury. He was later expected to face Cerrone on 23 May 2015, at UFC 187. However, Nurmagomedov pulled out of the bout on 30 April due to a recurring knee injury and was replaced by John Makdessi.

Nurmagomedov was expected to face Tony Ferguson on 11 December 2015 at The Ultimate Fighter 22 Finale. However, Nurmagomedov pulled out of the fight in late October, citing another injury, and was replaced by Edson Barboza.

The bout with Ferguson was rescheduled for 16 April 2016 at UFC on Fox 19. However, on 5 April, Ferguson pulled out of the bout due to a lung issue. Ferguson was replaced by promotional newcomer Darrell Horcher at a catchweight of 160 lb. Nurmagomedov won the one-sided fight by TKO in the second round.

In September, Nurmagomedov signed two contracts for a title shot against the reigning UFC Lightweight Champion, Eddie Alvarez, on either the UFC 205 or the UFC 206 fight card, with Dana White confirming the bout for UFC 205. However, on 26 September, the UFC announced that Alvarez would instead be defending the title against Conor McGregor. Nurmagomedov voiced his displeasure on social media, calling Alvarez a "bullshit champ" for refusing the fight and opting for a bout with McGregor instead, accusing the UFC of being a "freak show".

In lieu of a title shot, Nurmagomedov next faced Michael Johnson on 12 November 2016 at UFC 205. Nurmagomedov dominated the fight and was heard telling Dana White to give him a title shot as he mauled Johnson, winning via submission in the third round.

The bout with Ferguson was scheduled for a third time at UFC 209 on 4 March 2017 for the interim Lightweight Championship. Nurmagomedov, however, fell ill because of a botched weight cut, and the bout was cancelled as a result.

Nurmagomedov faced Edson Barboza on 30 December 2017 at UFC 219. Nurmagomedov dominated all three rounds, taking Barboza down repeatedly and dominating the fight with ground and pound. He won the fight by unanimous decision, with scores of 30–25, 30–25 and 30–24. This win also earned him his first Performance of the Night bonus.

UFC Lightweight Champion

Nurmagomedov vs. Iaquinta 

A bout with Ferguson had been scheduled for the fourth time and was expected to take place on 7 April 2018 at UFC 223. However, on 1 April 2018, it was reported that Ferguson had injured his knee and was to be replaced by Max Holloway. On 6 April, Holloway was pulled from the fight after the New York State Athletic Commission (NYSAC) declared him unfit to compete due to extreme weight cutting, and replaced by Al Iaquinta. Iaquinta's inclusion in the fight was controversial: the UFC's first choice to replace Holloway, Anthony Pettis, weighed in 0.2 pounds over the championship limit of 155 pounds and did not choose to re-weigh, and its second choice, Paul Felder, was rejected by NYSAC because he was not in the UFC's rankings at the time of the fight. Only Nurmagomedov was eligible to win the championship, as Iaquinta also weighed in 0.2 pounds over the championship weight limit. Nurmagomedov dominated the fight and won via unanimous decision, with scores of 50–44, 50–43 and 50–43, and became the UFC Lightweight Champion.

Nurmagomedov vs. McGregor 

On Friday, 3 August 2018, the UFC announced that Nurmagomedov would make his first defence of his lightweight title against Conor McGregor at UFC 229 on October 6 in Las Vegas. In the fight, Nurmagomedov won the first two rounds, but lost the third round to McGregor. It was the first time Nurmagomedov lost a round in his UFC career. He managed to defeat McGregor in the fourth round via submission. After the contest, Nurmagomedov scaled the Octagon and tried to attack McGregor's teammate Dillon Danis, which resulted in a brawl between the two teams. After the bout against the Irishman, Khabib improved his record to 27–0 which was then the longest win streak in UFC history. The event drew 2.4 million pay-per-view buys, the most ever for an MMA event.

Nurmagomedov vs. Poirier 

In June 2019, Nurmagomedov signed a new multi-fight contract with the UFC. In the first fight of his new deal, Nurmagomedov made the second defence of his title against interim lightweight champion Dustin Poirier on 7 September 2019 in the main event at UFC 242. He won the fight via a rear naked choke submission in the third round. The win unified both titles and earned Nurmagomedov his second Performance of the Night bonus award. He and Poirier swapped shirts after the fight as a show of respect. In his post-fight interview Nurmagomedov said that he would be selling the shirt Poirier gave him and donating the proceeds to Poirier's charity. The shirt sold for $100,000 and the donation was matched by UFC president Dana White.

Nurmagomedov vs. Gaethje 

Nurmagomedov was scheduled to defend his title against Tony Ferguson on 18 April 2020 at UFC 249. This was the fifth time that a fight between the pair had been scheduled, and both fighters were on 12-fight win streaks in the UFC. However, Nurmagomedov was unable to leave Russia because of restricted air travel due to the COVID-19 pandemic, and so was removed from the card. Ferguson instead faced top contender Justin Gaethje for the interim UFC Lightweight Championship at UFC 249, which was postponed to 9 May. Gaethje won the fight by fifth-round TKO, thus ending Ferguson's win streak and securing himself a shot at the undisputed title against Nurmagomedov.

Nurmagomedov faced Gaethje in a unification bout on 24 October 2020 in the main event at UFC 254. Nurmagomedov won the fight via technical submission with a triangle choke in the second round to defend and re-unify the UFC Lightweight Championship. In his post-fight interview, Nurmagomedov announced his retirement from mixed martial arts. He explained that he had promised his mother that he would not continue to fight without his late father, "No way I'm going to come here without my father. It was first time after what happened with my father, when UFC called me about Justin, I talk with my mother three days. She doesn't want me to go fight without my father but I promised her it was going to be my last fight. If I give my word, I have to follow this. It was my last fight here." This win earned him the Performance of the Night award. Daniel Cormier claimed in an episode of DC & Helwani, after the fight, that Khabib had said he chose the triangle choke instead of an arm bar in order to prevent Gaethje from being injured.

Retirement and vacation of the UFC Lightweight Championship
Despite attempted negotiations to bring him back for one more fight, UFC president Dana White announced on 19 March 2021 that he had accepted Nurmagomedov's decision to retire and that the UFC Lightweight Championship had been officially vacated.

On July 1, 2022  Nurmagomedov was inducted into the UFC Hall of Fame on the International Fight Week in Las Vegas.

MMA promoter 
Following his retirement, Nurmagomedov purchased the Gorilla Fighting Championship (GFC), a Russian-based MMA promotion, for $1 million – going on to rename it as the Eagle Fighting Championship (EFC).

MMA coach and cornerman 
Since retiring in October 2020, Nurmagomedov has been an active coach with American Kickboxing Academy head coach Javier Mendez. He currently coaches and corners current UFC Lightweight Champion Islam Makhachev, Zubaira Tukhugov (UFC), Tagir Ulanbekov (UFC), Islam Mamedov (Bellator), Gadzhi Rabadanov (Bellator), Saygid Izagakhmaev (ONE Championship) and cousins Abubakar Nurmagomedov (UFC), Umar Nurmagomedov (UFC), Usman Nurmagomedov (Bellator), and Belal Muhammad at UFC 280.

Fighting style 
Nurmagomedov employs a wrestling-based style of relentless pressure against his opponents, often described as "mauling". Using a variety of wrestling and judo/sambo takedowns, he forces his opponents against the cage, and locks up their legs and an arm to prevent them from escaping. From this position, he exhausts his opponents by forcing his weight against them and attacks with measured strikes his opponents are often unable to defend. This was one of his many signature styles that he used to deploy to advance towards his finishing move. Throughout his career, nineteen of his twenty-nine victories had come by way of either TKO/KO or submission.

Former three-time UFC Heavyweight Champion and two-time UFC Light Heavyweight Champion Randy Couture praised Nurmagomedov as “brilliant”. MMA Commentator Joe Rogan, a black belt in both 10th Planet Jiu-Jitsu and Brazilian Jiu-Jitsu, said of Nurmagomedov, “He’s the most terrifying lightweight contender in the world,” and “he’s just on such another level [of grappling] that the odds of beating him drop significantly after the first minute-and-a-half.” UFC referee Herb Dean stated Nurmagomedov constantly talks to his opponents during fights.

Personal life 

As part of his Dagestani Avar culture, Nurmagomedov frequently wears a papakha hat after fights and during promotional events. He speaks several languages, including Avar, Kumyk, Russian, English, Turkish, and Arabic. As of 2019, Nurmagomedov is a third-year student at the Plekhanov Russian University of Economics. He is an avid football fan and supporter of the clubs Anzhi Makhachkala, Galatasaray, Real Madrid and Liverpool, as well as the Russia national team.

In August 2021, there was speculations going round that Nurmagomedov had signed a professional Football contract with third tier Russian side Legion Dynamo after he was seen shaking hands with the players and manager, However a few days later Nurmagomedov denied he had signed a professional contract instead saying he is very close to the club and just a fan.

Nurmagomedov is a Sunni Muslim. In October 2020, The Guardian stated that Nurmagomedov is the second-most popular Muslim athlete in the world, behind only the Egyptian footballer Mohamed Salah. The Guardian additionally stated that, since his high-profile victory over McGregor, Nurmagomedov has used his influential status to "further his ultra-conservative worldview". In 2018, Nurmagomedov advocated a crackdown on nightclubs in his home region of Dagestan, and levelled criticism at a rap concert held in Makhachkala, which led to rapper Egor Kreed cancelling his performances in the region. In 2019, Nurmagomedov spoke out against a play held in Dagestan that featured a scene of a scantily-clad woman seducing a man. He described the play as "filth", recommended that there be a governmental investigation into its production, and called for those involved to issue a public apology, which allegedly led to the producer of the play receiving threats on social media. In October 2020, Nurmagomedov criticised the President of France Emmanuel Macron in the wake of the murder of Samuel Paty, stating "May the Almighty disfigure the face of this creature and all its followers, who, under the slogan of freedom of speech, offend the feelings of more than one and a half billion Muslim believers. May the Almighty humiliate them in this life, and in the next."

Nurmagomedov has trained with SC Bazarganova in Kizilyurt, Dagestan (2012), K-Dojo, AMA Fight Club in Fairfield, New Jersey (2012), Mamishev Fight Team in Saint Petersburg (2012), Fight Spirit Team in Kolpino, St. Petersburg (2013), and KHK MMA Team in Bahrain (2015), which was funded by Bahraini prince Khalid bin Hamad Al Khalifa. In 2016, Nurmagomedov co-founded his own team, Eagles MMA, with support from the Dagestani billionaire Ziyavudin Magomedov. After Magomedov was arrested on charges of embezzlement in 2018, Nurmagomedov used his post-fight speech at UFC 223 to appeal to Russian president Vladimir Putin for Magomedov's release from jail. Nurmagomedov has also hosted a training seminar at the Akhmat MMA fight club that is funded by Head of the Chechen Republic Ramzan Kadyrov, who has received criticism from some quarters for his government's alleged human rights abuses.

In December 2021, Nurmagomedov's manager Ali Abdelaziz publicly offered former UFC rival Tony Ferguson a grappling match against Nurmagomedov.

Family 
Nurmagomedov married Patimat in June 2013 and they have three children: a daughter born 1 June 2015, a son born 30 December 2017, and a son born on 22 December 2019. The first son was named Magomed, after Khabib's great-grandfather. Among Nurmagomedov's cousins are fellow UFC fighters Abubakar Nurmagomedov and Umar Nurmagomedov, and Bellator fighter Usman Nurmagomedov.

In May 2020, Nurmagomedov's father and long-time trainer Abdulmanap was placed in a medically induced coma after contracting COVID-19 following a heart surgery. He died on 3 July 2020 at a clinic in Moscow, at the age of 57.

Awards 
In October 2018, Nurmagomedov was made an "Honorary Citizen of Grozny" by the mayor of Grozny Ibrahim Zakriev after his victory against McGregor at UFC 229. He was also presented with a Mercedes car by Chechnya's head Ramzan Kadyrov, funded from the Akhmad Kadyrov Foundation, and his father Abdulmanap was awarded the title of "Honoured Worker of Physical Culture of the Chechen Republic" by Kadyrov.

On 5 December, 2019, Head of the Republic of Dagestan Vladimir Vasilyev awarded Nurmagomedov and his father, Abdulmanap the Order For Services to the Republic of Dagestan for their "significant contributions to sports in Dagestan".

Controversies

Bus attack at UFC 223 Media Day 
On 3 April 2018, Nurmagomedov and fellow fighter Artem Lobov had an altercation, in which Nurmagomedov and his entourage cornered Lobov and slapped him multiple times. Lobov is known to be close to Conor McGregor, with whom Nurmagomedov had verbal altercations and trash talk exchanges. Two days later, during promotional appearances for UFC 223, McGregor and his entourage were let into the Barclays Center by credentialed members of his promotional team. They confronted Nurmagomedov, who was on a bus leaving the arena with other "red corner" fighters for UFC 223 onboard, including Rose Namajunas, Al Iaquinta, Karolina Kowalkiewicz, Ray Borg, and Michael Chiesa. McGregor ran up alongside the slowly moving bus and then ran past it to grab a metal equipment dolly, which he threw at the bus's window, before trying to throw other objects in the vicinity. Chiesa and Borg were injured by the shattered glass, and sent to hospital. They were soon removed from the card on the advice of the NYSAC and the UFC's medical team.

McGregor and others involved initially fled the Barclays Center after the incident. UFC president Dana White said there was a warrant out for McGregor's arrest, and the NYPD said McGregor was a person of interest. White claimed McGregor told him via text message: "This had to be done." White said, "You can imagine he's going to be sued beyond belief," and denied suggestions that the violence was a stunt intended to generate interest in the UFC. McGregor later turned himself in to a police station, where he faced three counts of assault and one count of criminal mischief. He was further charged with menacing and reckless endangerment at his arraignment and released on $50,000 bail until 14 June 2018. Under the bail conditions set by the judge, McGregor was allowed to travel without restriction. McGregor later pleaded no contest to a count of disorderly conduct and was ordered to perform five days of community service and attend anger management classes.

Incident at UFC 229 
On 6 October 2018, following his victory over Conor McGregor at UFC 229, Nurmagomedov jumped over the octagon fence and charged at McGregor's cornerman, Dillon Danis. Danis had reportedly shouted insults at Nurmagomedov. Soon afterwards, McGregor and Abubakar Nurmagomedov, Khabib's cousin, attempted to exit the octagon, but a scuffle broke out between them after McGregor punched Abubakar, who then punched him back. McGregor was then attacked from behind inside the octagon by two of Nurmagomedov's cornermen, Zubaira Tukhugov and Esed Emiragaev. Tukhugov, a Chechen fighter, was scheduled to fight on 27 October 2018 at UFC Fight Night: Volkan vs. Smith against Artem Lobov, the McGregor team member who was confronted by Nurmagomedov in April 2018. Tukhugov was removed from the card on 17 October.

Nurmagomedov's payment for the fight was withheld by the Nevada State Athletic Commission (NSAC) as a result, pending an investigation into his actions. He appeared at the post-fight interview and apologized to the NSAC, saying he was provoked by McGregor's trash talk and the UFC 223 bus incident, adding, "You cannot talk about religion. You cannot talk about nation. Guys, you cannot talk about these things. This is very important to me." He later posted on Instagram that he had warned McGregor that he would pay for everything he had done on 6 October. Khabib's father, Abdulmanap, later said he did not hold a grudge towards McGregor and invited him to Russia to train.

The NSAC filed a formal complaint against both Nurmagomedov and McGregor, and on 24 October, the NSAC voted to approve a motion to release half of Nurmagomedov's $2 million fight payout immediately. Both Nurmagomedov and McGregor received indefinite bans until an official hearing would determine the disciplinary outcome of the post-fight brawl. On 29 January 2019, the NSAC announced a nine-month suspension for Nurmagomedov (retroactive to 6 October 2018) and a $500,000 fine. He was eligible to compete again on 6 July 2019. McGregor also received a six-month suspension and $50,000 fine, while Abubakar Nurmagomedov and Zubaira Tukhugov each received 12-month suspensions and fines of $25,000. Khabib Nurmagomedov complained about the NSAC's decisions and stated he no longer wished to compete in the state of Nevada.

Comments on ring girls 
In August 2021, Nurmagomedov attracted controversy after an EFC press conference when asked by a reporter about why he does not have ring girls at his promotion. Khabib stated that he did not have an issue with how other promotions went about their operations, stating that they are welcome to do things however they wish, but that he did not see a need for them in his promotion. He said that he personally saw no point to ring girls and their function of parading round cards around before the start of each round. According to him, it is a pointless exercise that makes him "uncomfortable".

Championships and accomplishments 

 Mixed martial arts 

 Ultimate Fighting Championship
 UFC Hall of Fame (Modern-Era Wing, Class of 2022)
 UFC Lightweight Championship (One time)
 Three successful title defenses
 Longest Lightweight champion reign in UFC history (1077 days)
 Tied for third longest win streak in UFC history (13) w. Georges St-Pierre, Max Holloway, Jon Jones and Demetrius Johnson
 Performance of the Night (Three times) 
 Most takedowns in a single UFC fight (UFC 160: 21 takedowns on 28 attempts; 3 rounds) vs. Abel Trujillo
 Tied for Most title defenses in Lightweight division UFC history (3) (w. B.J. Penn, Frankie Edgar and Benson Henderson)
 Tied for Most consecutive title defenses in Lightweight division UFC history (3) (w. B.J. Penn, Frankie Edgar and Benson Henderson)
 Tied for Most title wins in Lightweight division UFC history (4) (w. B.J. Penn and Benson Henderson)
 Most submissions wins in Lightweight division title fights UFC history (3)
 Most consecutive wins in Lightweight division UFC history (13)
 Tied second-most submissions win in title fights UFC history (3) (w. Jon Jones, Ronda Rousey, Matt Hughes and B.J. Penn)
 Second Russian UFC champion (after Oleg Taktarov)
 First Muslim UFC champion
 2020 UFC Honors Submission of the Year vs. Justin Gaethje
 M-1 Global
 M-1 Challenge: 2009 Selections
 Atrium Cup
 Pankration Atrium Cup 2008 tournament winner
 Sherdog.com
 2013 Breakthrough Fighter of the Year.
 2016 Beatdown of the Year (UFC 205: vs. Michael Johnson).
 2016 Comeback Fighter of the Year
 Fightbooth.com
 2013 Staredown of the Year (UFC 160: vs. Abel Trujillo)
 MMAdna.nl
 2017 Performance of the Year (UFC 219: vs. Edson Barboza)
 MMAjunkie.com
 2020 October Submission of the Month 
 2022 Coach of the year w. Javier Mendez 
 World MMA Awards
 2016 International Fighter of the Year.
 2021 Submission of the Year vs. Justin Gaethje at UFC 254
Voting period for 2021 awards ran from July 2020 to July 2021 due to the COVID-19 pandemic.
Wrestling Observer Newsletter
Mixed Martial Arts Most Valuable (2020)
 BBC Sports Personality World Sport Star of the Year
 2020 World Sport Star of the Year
 Russian Public Opinion Research Center (VTsIOM)
Best Sportsman in Russia
 ESPY Award
2021 Best MMA fighter

 Sambo 

 Combat Sambo Federation of Russia
2009 Russian Combat Sambo Championships (−74 kg) Gold Medalist
 World Combat Sambo Federation
2009 World Combat Sambo Championships (−74 kg) Gold Medalist
2010 World Combat Sambo Championships (−82 kg) Gold Medalist

 ARB (Army Hand-to-Hand Combat) 

 Russian Union of Martial Arts
European Champion of Army Hand-to-Hand Combat

 Pankration 

 International Pankration federation 
European Pankration Champion

 Grappling 

 NAGA World Championship
2012 Men's No-Gi Expert Welterweight Champion
2012 ADCC Rules No-Gi Expert Welterweight Champion

Mixed martial arts record

|-
|Win
|align=center|29–0
|Justin Gaethje
|Technical Submission (triangle choke)
|UFC 254 
|
|align=center|2
|align=center|1:34
|Abu Dhabi, United Arab Emirates
|
|-
|Win
| align=center|28–0
| Dustin Poirier
|Submission (rear-naked choke)
| UFC 242 
| 
| align=center|3
| align=center|2:06
| Abu Dhabi, United Arab Emirates
|
|-
| Win 
| align=center|27–0
| Conor McGregor
| Submission (neck crank)
| UFC 229
| 
| align=center|4
| align=center|3:03
| Las Vegas, Nevada, United States
| 
|-
| Win 
| align=center|26–0
| Al Iaquinta
| Decision (unanimous)
| UFC 223
| 
| align=center|5
| align=center|5:00
| Brooklyn, New York, United States
| 
|-
| Win
| align=center|25–0
| Edson Barboza
| Decision (unanimous)
| UFC 219
| 
| align=center|3
| align=center|5:00
| Las Vegas, Nevada, United States
| 
|-
| Win 
| align=center|24–0
| Michael Johnson
| Submission (kimura)
| UFC 205
| 
| align=center|3
| align=center|2:31
| New York City, New York, United States
|
|-
| Win 
| align=center|23–0
| Darrell Horcher
| TKO (punches)
| UFC on Fox: Teixeira vs. Evans
| 
| align=center|2
| align=center|3:38
| Tampa, Florida, United States
| 
|-
| Win 
| align=center| 22–0
| Rafael dos Anjos
| Decision (unanimous)
| UFC on Fox: Werdum vs. Browne
| 
| align=center| 3
| align=center| 5:00
| Orlando, Florida, United States
|
|-
| Win 
| align=center| 21–0
| Pat Healy
| Decision (unanimous)
| UFC 165
| 
| align=center| 3
| align=center| 5:00
| Toronto, Ontario, Canada
|
|-
| Win 
| align=center| 20–0
| Abel Trujillo
| Decision (unanimous)
| UFC 160
| 
| align=center| 3
| align=center| 5:00
| Las Vegas, Nevada, United States
| 
|-
| Win 
| align=center| 19–0
| Thiago Tavares
| KO (punches and elbows)
| UFC on FX: Belfort vs. Bisping
| 
| align=center| 1
| align=center| 1:55
| São Paulo, Brazil
| 
|-
| Win 
| align=center| 18–0
| Gleison Tibau
| Decision (unanimous)
| UFC 148
| 
| align=center| 3
| align=center| 5:00
| Las Vegas, Nevada, United States
|
|-
| Win 
| align=center| 17–0
| Kamal Shalorus
| Submission (rear-naked choke)
| UFC on FX: Guillard vs. Miller
| 
| align=center| 3
| align=center| 2:08
| Nashville, Tennessee, United States
| 
|-
| Win
| align=center| 16–0
| Arymarcel Santos
| TKO (punches)
| ProFC 36: Battle on the Caucas
| 
| align=center| 1
| align=center| 3:33
| Khasavyurt, Russia
|
|-
| Win
| align=center| 15–0
| Vadim Sandulskiy
| Submission (triangle choke)
| ProFC / GM Fight: Ukraine Cup 3
| 
| align=center| 1
| align=center| 3:01
| Odesa, Ukraine
|
|-
| Win
| align=center| 14–0
| Khamiz Mamedov
| Submission (triangle choke)
| ProFC 30: Battle on Don
| 
| align=center| 1
| align=center| 3:15
| Rostov-on-Don, Russia
|
|-
| Win
| align=center| 13–0
| Kadzhik Abadzhyan
| Submission (triangle choke)
| ProFC: Union Nation Cup Final
| 
| align=center| 1
| align=center| 4:28
| Rostov-on-Don, Russia
|
|-
| Win
| align=center| 12–0
| Ashot Shaginyan
| KO (punches)
| ProFC: Union Nation Cup 15
| 
| align=center| 1
| align=center| 2:18
| Rostov-on-Don, Russia
|
|-
| Win
| align=center| 11–0
| Said Khalilov
| Submission (kimura)
| ProFC: Union Nation Cup 14
| 
| align=center| 1
| align=center| 3:16
| Rostov-on-Don, Russia
|
|-
| Win
| align=center| 10–0
| Alexander Agafonov
| TKO (corner stoppage)
| M-1 Selection Ukraine 2010: The Finals
| 
| align=center| 2
| align=center| 5:00
| Kyiv, Ukraine
|
|-
| Win
| align=center| 9–0
| Vitaliy Ostroskiy
| TKO (punches)
| M-1 Selection Ukraine 2010: Clash of the Titans
| 
| align=center| 1
| align=center| 4:06
| Kyiv, Ukraine
| 
|-
| Win
| align=center| 8–0
|Ali Bagov
| Decision (unanimous)
| Golden Fist Russia
| 
| align=center| 2
| align=center| 5:00
| Moscow, Russia
| 
|-
| Win
| align=center| 7–0
| Shahbulat Shamhalaev
| Submission (armbar)
| M-1 Challenge: 2009 Selections 9
| 
| align=center| 1
| align=center| 4:36
| St. Petersburg, Russia
| 
|-
| Win
| align=center| 6–0
| Eldar Eldarov
| TKO (punches)
| rowspan=2|Tsumada Fighting Championship 3
| rowspan=2|
| align=center| 2
| align=center| 2:44
| rowspan=2|Agvali, Russia
|  
|-
| Win
| align=center| 5–0
| Said Akhmed
| TKO (punches)
| align=center| 1
| align=center| 2:05
| 
|-
| Win
| align=center| 4–0
| Shamil Abdulkerimov
| Decision (unanimous)
| rowspan=3|Pankration Atrium Cup 1
| rowspan=3|
| align=center| 2
| align=center| 5:00
| rowspan=3|Moscow, Russia
|  
|-
| Win
| align=center| 3–0
| Ramazan Kurbanismailov
| Decision (unanimous)
| align=center| 2
| align=center| 5:00
|  
|-
| Win
| align=center| 2–0
| Magomed Magomedov
| Decision (unanimous)
| align=center| 2
| align=center| 5:00
|  
|-
| Win
| align=center| 1–0
| Vusal Bayramov
| Submission (triangle choke)
| CSFU: Champions League
| 
| align=center| 1
| align=center| 2:20
| Poltava, Ukraine
| 
|-

Television viewership

Pay-per-view bouts

Network television (non-PPV)

See also
 List of male mixed martial artists
 List of undefeated mixed martial artists

Notes

References

External links

 
 

1988 births
Living people
Nurmagomedov family
Russian male mixed martial artists
Dagestani mixed martial artists
Lightweight mixed martial artists
Mixed martial artists utilizing sambo
Mixed martial artists utilizing ARB
Mixed martial artists utilizing pankration
Mixed martial artists utilizing judo
Mixed martial artists utilizing freestyle wrestling
Mixed martial artists utilizing wrestling
Ultimate Fighting Championship male fighters
Ultimate Fighting Championship champions
Ground-and-pound fighters
Russian sambo practitioners
Russian male judoka
Sportspeople from Makhachkala
BBC Sports Personality World Sport Star of the Year winners
Russian people of Dagestani descent
Russian expatriates in the United States
Russian Muslims
People from Tsumadinsky District
Avar people
ESPY Awards